Kim (born as Satyakim Yashpal, also known as Kim Yashpal) is an Indian retired actress and model, who is recognized for her work in Hindi cinema, particularly for starring in supporting roles, with the exception of her lead roles in Phir Wahi Raat (1980) and Disco Dancer (1982). The latter film is the highest grossing of her career.

In the later years of her career, Kim appeared primarily in guest roles and item numbers. She officially retired from acting in 1993; aside from Phir Wahi Raat and Disco Dancer, her notable roles include Naseeb and Bulundi in 1981, and Commando in 1988, all of which she appeared in supporting roles. Since her retirement, Kim has stayed out of the public media.

Career 
Kim's early years in her career consisted of modeling, in which she appeared on the covers of various magazines, including Star & Style magazine. She then began acting in 1979, making an appearance in Pehredaar, which then ultimately became a lost film.

In 1980, Kim starred in Danny Denzongpa's psychological horror-film Phir Wohi Raat as Asha, a young woman who has recurring nightmares and goes through traumatic experiences. The film performed well at the box-office and brought her recognition.

In 1981, Kim went to star in Manmohan Desai's Bollywood movie Naseeb, playing the role of a young girl in the middle of love and criminal controversies. The film was a commercial-success, and was the second highest-grossing film of the year. She also starred in Esmayeel Shroff's crime film Bulundi as the sister of Raaj Kumar's character of a professor. It was a moderate hit at the box-office. 

In 1982, Kim was then cast in her first starring role as Rita Oberoi, the daughter of a criminal, in the Hindi film Disco Dancer, the heroine to Mithun Chakraborty. The film turned to be a success at the box-office, and was the highest-grossing film of the year; The songs were also a major success, and her performance in the song "Jimmy Jimmy Aaja Aaja" brought her fame. The film was idolized as a classic in Bollywood cinema, and helped established her as an actress.

Kim also appeared in Deepak Bahry's action film Hum Se Hai Zamana as Sona, the girlfriend of Danny Denzongpa's character, Karan; she was particularly praised for a scene where she runs away in a bikini after being pursued by bandits.

Kim starred as Padmini in K S R Swamy's action film Maha Shaktimaan, and was also cast as Monica in Raj N. Sippy's film Andar Baahar, and as Soniya and Rashmi in Dilawar. She later appeared in Babbar Subhash's film Commando, as Jhum Jhum, and in Baaghi: A Rebel for Love in a guest appearance; both films were hits at the box-office.

Kim retired from the film industry in 1993. Her last films were guest roles in Pratikar, Honeymoon, Balwaan, Muskurahat, and Bulund. She also appeared in a song for Chandra Mukhi, however it was later deleted.

Personal life 
Following her retirement, Kim stayed out of public media and press.

Kim was in a relationship with fellow Bollywood actor Danny Denzongpa, for seven years throughout the 1980s.

Filmography 
Kim's filmography references:

See also 
 List of Indian film actresses

References

External links 
 
 

Actresses in Hindi cinema
Place of birth missing (living people)
Date of birth missing (living people)
Living people
Year of birth missing (living people)
Indian female models